Babasaheb (Devanagari: बाबासाहेब, IAST: Bābāsāhēb) is a nickname given in India. It is a Marathi phrase which means "Respected Father" (Baba = father and Saheb = sir). This epithet is commonly applied to B. R. Ambedkar.

Other notable people with the name include:
 Babasaheb Bhosale (1921–2007), Indian politician
 Balwant Moreshwar Purandare (born 1922), also known as Babasaheb Purandare, Indian historian and writer
 Umakant Keshav Apte (1903–1971), also known as Babasaheb Apte

See also
 List of things named after Babasaheb Ambedkar
 Dr. Babasaheb Ambedkar (film) (2000), Indian feature film in English
 Dr. Babasaheb Ambedkar International Airport, Nagpur
 Dr. Babasaheb Ambedkar Marathwada University, Aurangabad, Maharashtra, India
 Dr. Babasaheb Ambedkar Open University, public institution of higher learning in Ahmedabad, Gujarat, India
 Dr. Babasaheb Ambedkar Technological University, unitary, autonomous university located at Lonere in Raigad district, Maharashtra, India
 Babasaheb Bhimrao Ambedkar University, Central University located in Lucknow, Uttar Pradesh

References

Titles in India
B. R. Ambedkar